The Diocese of El Camino Real is a diocese of the Episcopal Church in the United States of America, located in northern and central California. The diocese includes the cities of San Jose (the see city), Monterey, Santa Cruz, and San Luis Obispo. The diocese includes all Episcopal congregations in the counties of Santa Clara (except for some in Los Altos and Palo Alto), Santa Cruz, San Benito, Monterey, and San Luis Obispo.

El Camino Real is a member of Province 8, which comprises 17 dioceses and the Navajoland Area Mission in the western United States. There were 51 congregations and more than 16,000 members reported in 2003, down from 18,000 in 1994. Diocesan offices are at the 1896-built Sargent House located at 154 Central Avenue, Salinas, California 93901.

Following the 2008 Lambeth Conference, the diocese established an informal triangular relationship with the Anglican Diocese of Gloucester in England and the Diocese of Western Tanganyika in Tanzania.

History

The diocese, named for the historic El Camino Real, the King's Highway, was created from the Episcopal Diocese of California in 1980. The youngest Episcopal diocese in California, El Camino Real's cathedral, Trinity Cathedral in San Jose, built in 1863, is the oldest Episcopal cathedral in the state. 

Bishop Richard L. Shimpfky resigned in March 2004 and the diocese was administered from 2005 until 2007 by Assisting Bishop Sylvestre Romero-Palma, formerly the bishop of the Anglican Diocese of Belize.

On 10 November 2007, Mary Gray-Reeves was consecrated third bishop of the diocese. Elected 16 June 2007, Gray-Reeves, 44, was previously archdeacon for deployment for the Diocese of Southeast Florida. She is the 15th female Episcopal bishop and the 1,022nd bishop in the American succession.

On 11 January 2020, Lucinda Ashby was consecrated fourth bishop of the diocese, the second female bishop to succeed a female bishop in Episcopal Church history. Ashby had previously served as canon to the ordinary in the Diocese of Idaho, a position she held since 2011. She is the 1125th bishop in the American succession.

Bishops of El Camino Real

 C. Shannon Mallory (1980–1990)
 Richard L. Shimpfky (1990–2004)* Sylvestre Romero-Palma (Assisting) (2005–2007)
 Mary Gray-Reeves (2007-2020)
 Lucinda Ashby (2020- )

See also
 List of Succession of Bishops for the Episcopal Church, USA

References

External links
 Diocese of El Camino Real website
 Trinity Cathedral
 Official Web site of the Episcopal Church

El Camino Real
Culture of San Jose, California
Diocese of El Camino Real
Christian organizations established in 1980
Province 8 of the Episcopal Church (United States)